John Michael Seabright (born January 30, 1959) is an American lawyer who serves as a United States district judge of the United States District Court for the District of Hawaii.

Early life and education
Born in Wheeling, West Virginia, Seabright received a Bachelor of Arts degree from Tulane University in 1981 and a Juris Doctor from George Washington University Law School in 1984.

Career
Seabright was in private practice in Hawaii from 1984 to 1987. He was an Assistant United States Attorney in the District of Columbia from 1987 to 1990, and then held the same office in the United States District Court for the District of Hawaii from 1990 to 2005, becoming a supervisory Assistant United States Attorney in 2001. He was an adjunct professor at the William S. Richardson School of Law of the University of Hawaiʻi at Mānoa in 1999, 2000, and 2002.

Federal judicial service
On February 14, 2005, Seabright was nominated by President George W. Bush to a seat on the United States District Court for the District of Hawaii vacated by Alan Cooke Kay. Seabright was confirmed by the United States Senate on April 27, 2005, and received his commission on April 28, 2005. He became chief judge on November 6, 2015 when Susan Oki Mollway assumed senior status and served until November 6, 2022.

References

Sources

1959 births
Living people
21st-century American judges
Assistant United States Attorneys
George Washington University Law School alumni
Judges of the United States District Court for the District of Hawaii
Lawyers from Wheeling, West Virginia
Tulane University alumni
United States district court judges appointed by George W. Bush
William S. Richardson School of Law faculty